3 'N the Mornin' (Part Two) is a 1996 album by southern hip hop artist DJ Screw. It contains a collection of songs by Dirty South artists remixed using Screw's trademark chopped and screwed style.

Part Two is one of Screw's best known CDs. Houston Press called it one of the best Houston rap albums of all time.

Track listing

Personnel
Robert Earl Davis Jr. – main artist, producer, mixing, assistant engineering
Cedric Dormaine Hill – featured artist (tracks: 1, 2, 10)
Albert Driver – featured artist (tracks: 4, 11)
Botany Boyz – featured artists (tracks: 3, 12)
Dedrick D'Mon Rolison – featured artist (track 5)
Derek Woods – featured artist (track 6)
Andre Parish – featured artist (track 6)
Killa Hoe – featured artist (track 6)
Kenneth Doniell Moore – featured artist (track 7)
Jerald Morgan – featured artist (track 8)
2-Fancy – featured artist (track 8)
Reginald Gilliand – featured artist (track 9)
JT Thomas – featured artist (track 9)
Flava – featured artist (track 10)
Marcus Lakee Edwards – featured artist (track 13)
Brew – featured artist (track 14)
Flo – featured artist (track 14)
Spike – featured artist (track 14)
JOS – featured artist (track 14)
Russell Washington – executive producer
Keenan Lyles – engineering
Eddie Coleman – management
Pen & Pixel – artwork & design

Charts

References

External links

1996 albums
DJ Screw albums